Maya Devi Temple is an ancient Buddhist temple situated at the UNESCO World Heritage Site of Lumbini, Nepal and very close to the Indo–Nepal border. It is the main temple at Lumbini, a site traditionally considered the birthplace of Gautama Buddha. The temple stands adjacent to a sacred pool (known as puskarni) and a sacred garden. The archaeological remains at the site were previously dated to the third-century BCE brick buildings constructed by Ashoka. A sixth-century BCE timber shrine was discovered in 2013.

2013 discovery 

In November 2013, an international team of archaeologists digging under the temple discovered the remains of an ancient tree shrine dated before 550 BCE. The researchers speculated that the site is the earliest evidence of Buddhist structures and the first archaeological evidence of Gautama Buddha's life. The excavation was headed by Robin Coningham of Durham University, UK, and Kosh Prasad Acharya of the Pashupati Area Development Trust, Nepal. According to Coningham, the shrine is "the earliest Buddhist shrine in the world." The speculations of the researchers were widely reported in international press, to the dismay of the rest of the scientific community, who mostly have disputed the conclusions of the researchers. Julia Shaw, a lecturer in South Asian archaeology at University College London, cautioned that the shrine may represent pre-Buddhist tree worship, and that further research is needed. The conclusions drawn by the researchers were also heavily criticized by Buddhist scholar Richard Gombrich.

See also 
 Buddhist architecture
 History of Buddhism
 Timeline of Buddhism

Gallery

References

External links

Further reading 
 Coningham RAE, Acharya KP, Strickland KM et al. (2013) The earliest Buddhist shrine: excavating the birthplace of the Buddha, Lumbini (Nepal). Antiquity 87: 1104–1123

Buddhist architecture
Buddhist archaeological sites
Buddhist temples in Nepal
3rd-century BC religious buildings and structures
6th-century BC religious buildings and structures
Buildings and structures in Rupandehi District
Memorials to Ashoka
Archaeological sites in Nepal
3rd-century BC establishments in Nepal